7th ZAI Awards
Grammy West '96
Presenter(s)  

Broadcaster STV1 

Grand Prix Elán

◄ 6th │ 8th ►

The 7th ZAI Awards, honoring the best in the Slovak music industry for individual achievements for the year of 1996, took time and place on February 13, 1997, at the New Scene Theater in Bratislava.

Subtitled as Grammy West '96, the ceremony was held in association with the local Music Fund (HF) and hosted by Miroslav Žbirka.

Winners

Main categories

Others

References

External links
 ZAI Awards > Winners (Official site)
 Grammy West Awards > 1996 Winners (at SME)

07
Zai Awards
1996 music awards